is a 1990 Japanese pink film directed by Hisayasu Satō.

Synopsis
Tired of the belligerence and bad manners of a female customer, two shop owners kidnap her and subject her to a series of sexual assaults and tortures with utensils from the shop.

Cast
 Rokuzō
 Asuka Morimura
 Kazuhiro Sano
 Kiyomi Itō
 Sayoko Nakajima

Critical appraisal
Allmovie dismisses Serial Rape: Perverted Experiment as, "another barbaric pinku-eiga from cult filmmaker Hisayasu Sato". The review judges the plot to be "paper-thin" and "just an excuse to portray the woman being tied up, beaten, and raped with various home appliances". Noting that the sexual content is less pronounced than in most of Satō's pink films, Allmovie concludes that the film is, "likely to repel the average softcore viewer while disappointing fans of harder-edged entertainment".

In their Japanese Cinema Encyclopedia: The Sex Films, the Weissers give Serial Rape: Perverted Experiment two and a half stars out of four noting of the vicious violence towards women displayed in the film, that at least Satō gives the attacks some motivation this time.

Bibliography

English

Japanese

Notes

1990 films
Films directed by Hisayasu Satō
1990s Japanese-language films
Pink films
Films about rape
1990s Japanese films